The Tibi Dam (in Spanish embalse de Tibi) is a masonry dam on Monegre River about  south of Tibi in Valencian Community, Spain. It is one of the oldest non-Roman dams in Europe. It was constructed between 1579 and 1594 with the purpose of using its reservoir to help irrigate areas around Tibi. A spillway was constructed on the right side of the dam in 1697 after it partially failed due to flooding.

References

Dams in Spain
Alacantí
Masonry dams
Dams completed in the 16th century
Bien de Interés Cultural landmarks in the Province of Alicante